David Arias González (born 23 August 1995) is a Colombian swimmer. He competed in the men's 100 metre butterfly event at the 2017 World Aquatics Championships.

References

External links

1995 births
Living people
Colombian male swimmers
Place of birth missing (living people)
South American Games silver medalists for Colombia
South American Games bronze medalists for Colombia
South American Games medalists in swimming
Competitors at the 2018 South American Games
Swimmers at the 2019 Pan American Games
Male butterfly swimmers
Pan American Games competitors for Colombia
Competitors at the 2017 Summer Universiade
20th-century Colombian people
21st-century Colombian people